The Roman Catholic Diocese of Tainan (Lat: Dioecesis Tainanensis) is a diocese of the Latin Church of the Roman Catholic Church in Taiwan.

Erected in March 1961, the diocese is a suffragan of the Archdiocese of Taipei. The diocese has not undergone any jurisdictional changes.

Ordinaries
Stanislaus Lo Kuang (21 March 1961 Appointed – 15 February 1966 Appointed, Archbishop of Taipei) 
Paul Ch'eng Shih-kuang (7 June 1966 Appointed – 3 December 1990 Retired) 
Joseph Cheng Tsai-fa (3 December 1990 Appointed – 24 January 2004 Appointed, Archbishop of Taipei ) 
Bosco Lin Chi-nan (24 January 2004 Appointed  – 14 November 2020 Retired )
John Lee Juo-wang (14 November 2020 Appointed  – 19 June 2021 Resigned )
Bosco Lin Chi-nan (Apostolic Administrator) (19 June 2021 Appointed )

See also

Catholic Church in Taiwan

References

Tainan
Roman Catholic dioceses and prelatures established in the 20th century
Christian organizations established in 1961
1961 establishments in Taiwan
Tainan